The 2019–20 Jacksonville Dolphins men's basketball team represented Jacksonville University in the 2019–20 NCAA Division I men's basketball season. The Dolphins, led by sixth-year head coach Tony Jasick, played their home games at Swisher Gymnasium on the university's Jacksonville, Florida campus as members of the Atlantic Sun Conference. They finished the season 14–18, 7–9 in ASUN play to finish in a tie for sixth place. They lost in the quarterfinals of the ASUN tournament to North Florida.

Previous season
The Dolphins finished the 2018–19 season 12–20, 5–11 in conference play to finish in seventh place. In the ASUN tournament, they were defeated by Liberty in the quarterfinals.

Roster

Schedule and results

|-
!colspan=12 style=| Non-conference regular season

|-
!colspan=9 style=| Atlantic Sun Conference regular season

|-
!colspan=12 style=| Atlantic Sun tournament
|-

|-

Source

References

Jacksonville Dolphins men's basketball seasons
Jacksonville Dolphins
Jacksonville Dolphins men's basketball
Jacksonville Dolphins men's basketball